Margret may refer to -
1410 Margret, an asteroid
, a Norwegian steamship in service 1994-06/18
Margret Holmes Bates (1844-1927), American author
Margret Grebowicz, Polish philosopher, author, and professor
Ann-Margret, Swedish-American actress, singer, and dancer (born 1941)

See also
Margaret